Brahmāstra: Part One – Shiva is a 2022 Indian Hindi-language fantasy action-adventure film written and directed by Ayan Mukerji and produced by Karan Johar, Apoorva Mehta, Namit Malhotra, and Mukerji (in his debut production)under Dharma Productions, Starlight Pictures, and Prime Focus in association with Star Studios, along with Ranbir Kapoor and Marijke DeSouza. The film serves as the first installment of a planned trilogy, which is itself planned to be part of a cinematic universe titled Astraverse, and stars Amitabh Bachchan, Shah Rukh Khan, Ranbir Kapoor, Alia Bhatt, Mouni Roy and Nagarjuna Akkineni. Drawing inspiration from tales in Hindu mythology, the story follows Shiva, an orphan with pyrokinetic powers who discovers that he is an astra, a weapon of enormous energy. He attempts to prevent the strongest of the astras, the Brahmāstra, from falling into the hands of dark forces that share a history with him.

The film was first conceived by Mukerji in 2011, with core elements being inspired by Indian history and stories he heard in his childhood. Its development was first revealed in July 2014 with a planned release for 2016, but its official announcement arrived in October 2017 revealing that the film would be titled Brahmāstra and would be a trilogy. Principal photography lasted from February 2018 to March 2022, with filming locations including Bulgaria, London, New York City, Edinburgh, Thailand, Manali, Mumbai and Varanasi. Production and release of the film was delayed multiple times, first due to production delays and monetary constraints, and later due to the COVID-19 pandemic. The film's songs are composed by Pritam, with soundtrack lyrics written by Amitabh Bhattacharya.

Brahmāstra: Part One – Shiva was theatrically released on 9 September 2022 in standard formats, 3D and IMAX 3D by Star Studios in India, 20th Century Studios in North America, and by Walt Disney Studios Motion Pictures worldwide. It is the first production released under the Star Studios name following the acquisition of 21st Century Fox by Disney. The film received mixed reviews with praise for the visual effects, music, score and action sequences while criticism was mostly directed toward the story, screenplay, writing, performances and dialogue. The film emerged as a commercial success, with an estimated gross of over  worldwide, making it the highest-grossing Hindi film of 2022, one of the highest grossing Indian film of 2022 and the 20th highest-grossing Indian film of all time. Two sequels are being developed simultaneously.

At the 23rd IIFA Awards, Brahmāstra: Part One – Shiva received leading 10 nominations, including Best Story (original) (Ayan Mukerji), Best Director (Ayan Mukerji), Best Supporting Actor (Shah Rukh Khan) and Best Supporting Actress (Mouni Roy).At  Zee Cine Awards 2023 the film gets nomination for Best Film, Ranbir Kapoor for Best Actor and Alia Bhatt for Best Actress.

Plot 

In ancient India, a group of sages in the Himalayas collide with the energy Brahm-shakti, which produces many celestial weapons of great power called astras. The strongest among them, the Brahmāstra, has the capacity to destroy the world. The sages use their respective astras to tame the unstable Brahmāstra and become the Brahmānsh, a secret society to protect the world from the powers of astras.

In present-day Mumbai, Shiva, a disc jockey, falls in love at first sight with Isha Chatterjee, a London resident who is visiting India for the Durga Puja festival at her grandfather's pandal. Soon, Isha reciprocates and expresses her feelings for Shiva. Shiva tells her that he is an orphan who never knew his father, and that his mother died in a fire when he was a baby. Meanwhile, in Delhi, scientist and Brahmānsh member Mohan Bhargav is attacked by Zor and Raftar for a piece of Brahmāstra he safeguards. Mohan fights back using the Vānarāstra but is ultimately subdued by Junoon, who works for the mysterious Dev. Under Junoon's possession, Mohan reveals that the second piece of Brahmāstra is protected by an artist and archaeologist named Anish Shetty in Kashi. Before he can reveal the current location and guru of the Brahmānsh (Āshram), Mohan throws himself out of a balcony.

Shiva has a vision of Mohan's encounter with Junoon. He and Isha head for Kashi to warn Anish but are interrupted by Raftar, who now wields Mohan's Vānarāstra. Anish defeats him using the Nandi Astra before escaping with Shiva and Isha. While going to Himachal Pradesh, where Āshram is located, they are chased by Junoon and Zor in a truck. Anish gives the second piece of the Brahmāstra to Shiva and stays to fight Junoon and Zor, only to be killed. Shiva and Isha are chased by Raftar to Āshram where Shiva kills him using the Agnyāstra after he tried to kill Isha. At Āshram, they learn about other astras and Shiva is forced to join Brahmānsh by the guru Raghu for information on his parents. He meets other new recruits Rani, Raveena, Sher and Tenzing, who are all trained by Raghu on how to use their respective astras and Shiva also gains control over fire. As Junoon gets closer to them, Raghu reveals that Shiva is the son of former Brahmānsh members, Dev and Amrita. Dev actually awoke the Brahmāstra as he was the only person who was able to control multiple astras at once.

Amrita (pregnant with Dev's child), who wielded the Jalāstra, defeated him in a battle on a remote island and both of them seemingly perished from the battle. Amrita's boat was found in the ruins of the battle, brought back from the island, with two broken pieces of the Brahmāstra. The pieces of the Brahmāstra were given to both Mohan and Anish. The third piece was believed to be missing, with Raghu and Shiva concluding that they both survived the battle. The third piece of the Brahmāstra is in Amrita's Mayāstra disguised into a conch shell, which Raghu releases by dropping Shiva's blood on the conch. Junoon and her army arrive at Āshram for the Brahmāstra and hold everyone hostage. Shiva defeats Junoon while also killing Zor, who wielded Nandi Astra and releases everyone. But Junoon manages to take the third piece from Isha. She seemingly sacrifices herself to activate the Brahmāstra. The destruction starts to begin and Isha is in danger, but Shiva gains control over the Brahmāstra with newfound strength stemming from his protectiveness of Isha and reunites with her.

Before the credits, due to Junoon having activated the Brahmāstra, Dev, who was imprisoned as a statue on an unknown island, is released.

Cast

Production

Development 
The idea of Brahmāstra: Part One – Shiva first came to Mukerji in 2011 while writing the script for his second film Yeh Jawaani Hai Deewani (2013). Mukerji first announced that he was working on a new project in July 2014. In October 2017, Brahmāstra was officially announced by producer Karan Johar. Mukerji was signed as the director while Ranbir Kapoor and Alia Bhatt were set to star. Initially, the film's working title was  Dragon, but was officially titled as Brahmāstra in 2017. Mukerji explained that the title Brahmāstra "resonates with the ancient wisdom, energies and power." Mukerji also revealed that it is a "contemporary film with ancient elements." In 2017, Johar revealed his plan to make the film into a film trilogy. The preparation for the film started in January 2018.

In an interview, Kapoor stated that Mukerji "has spent six years of his life working really hard to make an original story" and that the trilogy would be made over a period of 10 years and refuted rumours suggesting that it is a romantic superhero film. Instead, Kapoor confirmed that the film is a "romantic-fairytale in a supernatural format". and that the film is not something which "doesn't have truth to it, or which is unbelievable". Nagarjuna Akkineni also confirmed that he would be playing a "pivotal" role. Mouni Roy revealed in an interview that she is the "only antagonist" in the film.

In June 2022, Mukerji announced the film would be a part of a trilogy franchiseserving as the first instalmentunder the Astraverse, a cinematic universe centered around various mystical astras. In August 2022, Roy confirmed Shah Rukh Khan had a cameo appearance in the film. The role of Khan is a spin-off from the character from the film Swades.

Pre-production
Ayan Mukherjee started work 9 years before the theatrical release. Pre-production work started in 2014 and filming began in 2018. In February 2018, Bachchan and Kapoor did look tests in the presence of Mukerji.

Themes 
In July 2022, a video was released featuring Mukerji explaining the mystical universe of various astras. He explained how from the Brahm-Shakti, astras were born, which compose all the different energies that are found in nature like Jalāstra (water), Pawanāstra (wind), and Agnyastra (fire). He also talked about astras that store the powers of different animals like the Vanarāstra, which can give the power of a "divine" monkey to the person who controls it, and the Nandiāstra, which contains the power and strength of a thousand bulls, within itself. The last āstra to emerge from the universe, carrying the collective power of the Brahm-Shakticalled the "lord of all the āstras"is explained to be one of the most powerful celestial weapons of gods (or Devas) in Hindu mythology, the Brahmāstra. Mukerji stated that the core idea was inspired by stories of Hindu mythology he heard in his childhood from his grandfather.

Characters 
Mukerji revealed that the inspiration behind actor Kapoor's character came from Rumi who also inspired the first look of his character. Mukerji also drew inspiration from Rumi's work: "love is the bridge between you and everything", to build the foundation of the film. Later, he revealed that the Rumi-inspired look was scrapped and Kapoor had gotten a haircut instead. Kapoor revealed his experience with look tests for the film, expressing that it is a "tedious job: sticking, removing applying, de-applying, and applying again, until some decision is reached".

Filming 
Principal photography began in February 2018 with the commencement of the first schedule of the film on 24 February 2018. The first schedule of the film was wrapped up in Bulgaria on 24 March 2018. The second schedule of filming continued in said country and then London on 8 July 2018, in New York in late July, and then back in Bulgaria by the end of the month. Extensive shooting started on 1 February 2019 at Edinburgh, Scotland. The 20-day schedule started in the Ramnagar Fort and Chet Singh Fort in Varanasi on 30 July 2019. The filming was halted in March 2020 due to the COVID-19 pandemic, and later resumed in November 2020. Filming wrapped up on 29 March 2022 in Varanasi. After S. S. Rajamouli's father, K.V. Vijayendra Prasad, proposed some changes in the film to Mukerji, reshoots were conducted for four days.

It was reported that the production budget for the film , which would make it one of the most expensive Indian films and the most expensive Hindi film ever at the time of its release. However, the lead actor Ranbir Kapoor later clarified that the reported budget was for production of all three main installments of the franchise, and the assets built during the production of the first film will be used in future installments.

Post-production 
In the post-production, it is estimated that 150 crore Indian rupees spent on VFX by makers. The VFX work of this film is done by DNEG- Prime focus company. Editing was supervised by Prakash Kurup. Jam8 music and sound design studio lead by Pritam provided sound effects. VFX studio DNEG and ReDefine's foreign team created visual effects. Chiranjeevi gave the voice-over for the Telugu version.  Ranbir and Alia did their dubbing portion in September 2020 in a studio in Bandra.

Music 

Pritam composed the soundtrack while composing the background score along with Prasad Shaste, Jim Satya, Meghdeep Bose, Tanuj Tiku & Ketan Sodha., while the songs are produced and mixed by British musician Steel Banglez, with songs written by Amitabh Bhattacharya. The score was recorded at Synchron Stage Vienna.

The film's titular soundtrack album was officially released on October 6 to streaming formats and digital retailers, coinciding with the occasion of Dussehra.

Marketing 

Brahmāstra: Part One – Shiva was one of the most anticipated Hindi releases of 2022. The title logo of the film was revealed on 4 March 2019. The same day, it was unveiled on Maha Shivratri at Kumbh Mela; 150 drones were used to lit the sky up to form it. The official logo of Brahmāstra was released on 6 March 2019, while SS Rajamouliwho serves as the film's presenter for its South Indian language versionsand Dhanush presented it in the Telugu, Tamil, Malayalam and Kannada versions on 12 March 2019. A forty-second motion logo was also released, with Bachchan's voiceover in it. Also on 12 March, a promotional behind-the-scenes video of the making of the music score for the motion logo, featuring the film's music composer Pritam, was released. On 5 April 2019, a promotional behind-the-scenes video of the execution of the title logo's unveiling in the sky was released. A motion poster featuring Kapoor's then undisclosed character was released on 14 December 2021. The following day, another motion poster featuring his character, Shiva, was released on 15 December 2021, while a fan event in support of the poster launch was held some hours prior to it in New Delhi, and was broadcast live by the film's streaming partner, Disney+ Hotstar, on its platform and social media. An event was held in Hyderabad to launch the Telugu, Tamil, Malayalam and Kannada versions of the motion poster, on 19 December 2021. On 16 March 2022, a poster and the first prologue of Bhatt's character, Isha, was released.

On 26 March 2022, Mukerji, Kapoor and Bhatt were featured in Byju's' "Cricket Live" segment as part of Star Sports' post cricket show during the inaugural IPL 2022 game between Chennai Super Kings and Kolkata Knight Riders while Kapoor appeared and announced the game in a television commercial. A promotional announcement video commemorating the film's wrap was released on 29 March 2022. On 10 April 2022, a motion poster featuring Kapoor and Bhatt's characters, and set to the song "Kesariya"sung by Arijit Singhwas released, along with a still version. The teaser of said song's Telugu version, titled "Kumkumala", sung by Sid Sriram, was released and presented by Rajamouli on 27 May 2022. On 31 May 2022, the film's teaser trailer was released, which also unveiled the release date of the official trailer; an event and fan "meet-and-greet" was held in Visakhapatnam in support of its release. First look posters of Bachchan's character, Guru, and Nagarjuna's character, Anish, were released during the second week of June. On 13 June 2022, an announcement video was released, revealing that actor Chiranjeevi will be lending his voice to Kapoor's character, Shiva, for the film's Telugu dubbed version. A first look motion poster of Roy's character, Junoon, was released the following day. On 15 June 2022, the film's official trailer was released, with an event in support of it, that included a preview screening of the trailer being held a day prior to its release in Mumbai. A 4K version of the trailer was released four days later. On 13 July 2022, a promotional featurette titled "The Vision of Brahmāstra", featuring Mukerji explaining the mystical universe of various āstras named as Astraverse and the creative vision behind it, was released. On 17 July 2022, hours prior to its release, the song "Kesariya", was unveiled in a livestream hosted by Bhatt and Mukerji on Instagram, in which they also discussed about the making of the track. On 31 July 2022, an Instagram filter featuring visuals of various āstras, was released. On 6 August 2022, a featurette was released featuring Mukerji sharing his complete journey and process till Part One – Shiva from the beginning of his vision for the Brahmāstra film trilogy. A 3D preview screening of the second song from the film's soundtrack, "Deva Deva", sung by Singh, was held in Mumbai that day as well, two days before the single's release.
 
In the second week of August, hoardings of the film's songs were held up in New York City and LA, in collaboration with YouTube Premium, in promotion of an "afterparty" livestream that was announced to take place on 18 August on the service. On 17 August 2022, a video was released, featuring Mukerji explain his inspirations behind the film, which dates back to anecdotes he heard as a child. A day later, the previously teased "afterparty" livestream session took place exclusively via YouTube Premiumon Sony Music India's channel, in support of the film's third song, "Dance Ka Bhoot"with Mukerji, Kapoor and Bhatt interacting with fans and discussing the film's music, production, and promotional campaign. A poster of Kapoor's character, featuring a snippet of the song's background music as well as teasing the music video, was released. On 24 August 2022, a promotional event in support of the film was held in Chennai, led by Kapoor, Rajamouli, and Nagarjuna. On 27 August 2022, a promotional summit as well as another "meet-and-greet" was held at IIT Bombay, with Kapoor and Bhatt. A pre-release event was also announced, which scheduled to be held on 2 September 2022, at Ramoji Film City, Hyderabad, with actor Jr NTR as the special guest. However, it was cancelled last-minute due to undisclosed reasons. On 30 August 2022, a clip featuring an excerpts of Kapoor's character, Shiva, from the film was shared, as part of a ten-day countdownwhich ran from 30 August to 8 Septemberto the film's release. Another clip was released as part of the countdown, featuring Bachchan's character, Guru, the following day, with Mukerji stating he chose 9 September 2022 as the release date as he believes nine is his lucky number. Kapoor and Bhatt co-starred together in an advertisement campaign of Spotify India, which was released in association with the film, featuring two of the film's songs, "Kesariya" and "Dance Ka Bhoot".

On 1 September 2022, Telugu, Tamil and Kannada versions of the "Vision of Brahmāstra" featurette, featuring Rajamouli explain the Astraverse's themes, were released. The film's release countdown continued with a clip introducing the Vānarāstra, released the same day, with media outlets speculating it to be part of Shah Rukh Khan's confirmed cameo appearance. On 3 September 2022, a pre-release promo was released in Hindi, Telugu and Tamil to announce the opening of advance bookings for tickets in theatres. On 4 September, a featurette of the film's action sequences and their filming and choreography, was shared. On 6 September 2022, a 3D exclusive fan preview screening of the film was announced, which was held in Mumbai the day before the film's release, on 8 September with Kapoor, Bhatt, and Mukerji. Tickets were available via PVR Cinemas' web store, and sold out within minutes of the announcement. A fan-meet and press conference with Mukerji, Kapoor, and Bhatt was also held in New Delhi to promote the film.

Release

Theatrical 
Brahmāstra: Part One – Shiva was released on 9 September 2022, in standard formats, 3D, IMAX 3D, and 4DX 3D. The film was released by Star Studios in India in Hindi, Tamil, Telugu, Malayalam, and Kannada languages, with Telugu film director S. S. Rajamouli presenting the dubbed versions in the latter four South Indian languages. It is the first film released under the Star Studios name following the acquisition of 21st Century Fox by Disney and rebranding of Fox Star Studios. The film was also released in North America by 20th Century Studios and worldwide on the same day by Walt Disney Studios Motion Pictures. It was shown in 5000 screens in India and 3000 overseas, for a worldwide total of 8000 screens, the widest for an Indian film. The film had planned paid previews in the United States on 8 September 2022, a day before its release.

The film was originally planned to release on 23 December 2016 but was delayed by several years owing to production delays and monetary constraints, and later due to the COVID-19 pandemic. In October 2017, the film was announced for a 15 August 2019 release; Brahmāstra was pushed to Christmas 2019 and then to the summer of 2020 due to pending work on the film's visual effects and music. In February 2020, its release date was announced as 4 December 2020. However, due to the COVID-19 pandemic in India, the release was delayed indefinitely. In December 2021, a final release date of 9 September 2022 was announced.

On 2 September 2022, the Delhi High Court, under an interim order, restrained eighteen piracy websites from illegally streaming the film on the Internet, following a lawsuit filed by Star India.

Before its release, there were calls for boycotting the film by right-wing Hindu nationalists who were opposed to all films from Bollywood, alleging that anti-Hindu sentiments were prevalent in the industry. An old interview of Kapoor where he had mentioned that he likes eating beef regained traction on social media platforms; cows are venerated in Hinduism. Consequently, Kapoor and Bhatt were stopped from entering the Mahakaleshwar Jyotirlinga in Ujjain by members of the Bajrang Dal, a Hindu nationalist organization.

Home media
On September 17, 2022, Rebecca Campbell, Chairman of International Content and Operations for Disney, confirmed while speaking with The Economic Times about the success of Disney+ Hotstar that the film will be streaming on Hulu in the US, Star+ in Latin America and Disney+ internationally. 

The film digitally premiered on Hulu in the U.S. and Disney+ Hotstar in India and overall Asia on November 4, 2022. An English dub of the film was also released on the former the same day. The film, alongside its English dub, was released on Disney+ on December 7, 2022.

Reception

Critical response 
Brahmāstra: Part One – Shiva received mixed reviews from critics and audience, with praise for the visual effects, music, score, and action sequences while criticism was directed towards the story, screenplay, writing, performances, and dialogue. The review aggregator website Rotten Tomatoes reported an approval rating of 52%, with an average score of 6/10, based on 33 reviews. The website's consensus reads, "Ambitious yet uneven, Brahmastra Part One: Shiva offers definite pleasures for Bollywood fans, although the incessant spectacle may ultimately overwhelm many viewers."

India 
Avinash Lohana of Pinkvilla rated the film 4 out of 5 stars and wrote "Brahmastra: Part One – Shiva is a classic example of ambition meeting vision and an immersive experience that promises entertainment". Amandeep Narang of ABP News rated the film 4 out of 5 stars and wrote "Brahmāstra deserves its due respect and place in Indian cinematic history". Rachana Dubey of The Times of India rated the film 3.5 out of 5 stars and wrote "Brahmāstra borrows from Indian mythology and folk tales, which is fantastic. The effort and passion invested in creating the universe in this film, replete with minute detailing, are worthy of appreciation". Tushar Joshi of India Today rated the film 3.5 out of 5 stars and called the film "a solid effort as the first chapter in this trilogy", remarking that the Astraverse "can take on the MCU". Sonil Dedhia of News 18 rated the film 3.5 out of 5 stars, calling it "a solid and satisfying watch, a well-crafted film", and appreciated Mukerji's vision, saying that it "needs to applauded". Fengyen Chiu of Mashable India rated the film 3.5 out of 5 stars and wrote "Brahmāstra is a complete visual feast rooted deep with Indian mythology. Ayan Mukerji has created a landmark moment in Indian cinema with the state-of-the art VFX". Sonal Verma of Zee News rated the film 3.5 out of 5 stars and wrote "The screenplay is filled with love, light, magic, ancient mysticism and mythology. The film has many surprises that will definitely make you go wow". Devesh Sharma of Filmfare rated the film 3.5 out of 5 stars and encouraged readers to watch Brahmāstra for "its visual appeal" and for "the burning chemistry" between Bhatt and Kapoor.

Saibal Chatterjee of NDTV rated the film 3 out of 5 stars and called it "ambitious and entertaining", further stating it "has the makings of a blockbuster of the sort that Bollywood has been desperately seeking for a while". Sukanya Verma of Rediff rated the film 3 out of 5 stars and stated it as "a work of star-struck ambition and high-octane energy whose razzle-dazzle hits many happy notes". Nandini Ramnath of Scroll.in rated the film 3 out of 5 stars and wrote, "Brahmāstra: Part One – Shiva gets the pyrotechnics right but fumbles in creating an emotionally involving alternate reality". Sowmya Rajendran of The News Minute rated the film 3 out of 5 stars and wrote "Brahmāstra constantly tries to make your jaw drop to the floor with the visual effects, but since we never empathize with the characters on screen, it remains a distant spectacle". Rohit Vats of DNA India rated the film 3 out of 5 stars, stating that "Brahmāstra tries hard to present itself as the revelation of deeper truths of humankind but doesn't exactly get there where it wanted to be", and said the film is "grand and has all the tropes of mega Bollywood projects, and is enthralling". Stutee Ghosh of The Quint rated the film 3 out of 5 stars and wrote "Brahmastra grabs us in parts. If the unnecessary parts about love and lovers could have been avoided the impact would have been stronger. For now, the sound and light show should suffice". Monika Rawal Kukreja of Hindustan Times stated, "Ranbir Kapoor and Alia Bhatt are electric in this Ayan Mukerji spectacle. The film is a treat for long-waiting fans of Hindi cinema." Anuj Kumar of The Hindu stated "Despite the presence of Ranbir Kapoor, Alia Bhatt and Amitabh Bachchan, the film's writing turns out to be its biggest drawback with all the hype over Indian mythology just being a cosmetic cover".

Reputed film critic Taran Adarsh rated the film 2 out of 5 stars and wrote "Brahmāstra is a king-sized disappointment High on VFX, low on content [second half nosedives]. Brahmāstra could've been a game changer, but, alas, it is a missed opportunity. All gloss, no soul." Rohit Bhatnagar of The Free Press Journal rated the film 2.5 out of 5 stars and stated "a so-called critique-proof film Brahmāstra: Part One – Shiva might have a larger-than-life scale, grandeur, and visual spectacle but nothing more to this run-of-the-mill good v/s evil story." Writing for Deccan Herald, Vivek M. V. gave a rating of 2.5 out of 5 and wrote that the film has "tame and silly dialogues. This further dents the weakly-written love story, which is the film's biggest problem". Anna M. M. Vetticad of Firstpost rated the film 2 out of 5 stars, finding its story "weak" and the romance between the leads "unconvincing". Rayan Sayyed of IGN India also criticized the romance between the film's leads and wrote that "the mythology and its computer-generated portrayals are the only reasons to watch this film." Shubhra Gupta of The Indian Express rated the film 1.5 out of 5 stars, panning it: "Despite all those non-stop computer graphics, the opulence of the sets, the starry array, the film's commitment to its subject, we never really buy into it completely". Ishita Bhargav of Financial Express found the film to be cliché and criticized the dialogue, stating that the "grand vision ends up becoming a film for kids." Pooja Biraia Jaiswal of The Week rated the film 1 out of 5 stars and said Mukerji "has wasted the skills and popularity of Shah Rukh Khan, Nagarjuna, and of course, Amitabh Bachchan". A critic of The Wire panned the film by stating "the story lacks vitality, momentum, and intrigue. The film is devoid of genuine joy. Characters and settings come at you all the time, as if you've entered a lunch buffet on a full stomach."

International 
American audiences polled by PostTrak gave the film a 70% overall positive score, with 60% saying they would definitely recommend it.

Simon Abrams of the TheWrap commented that the film plays out as exceedingly familiar superhero fantasy but somehow hasn't nailed the genre. Courtney Howard of Variety called the film "a wildly entertaining jump start to a planned trilogy" and was appreciative of Mukerji's direction: "He smashes up genre conventions as Western cinematic influences readily co-mingle with pure Bollywood razzle-dazzle." Conversely, Scott Mendelson from Forbes rated the film 4 out of 10 and commented that "despite strong production values and the expected larger-than-life razzle-dazzle, this first entry in India's first original cinematic universe repeats the same mistake that doomed Universal's Dark Universe and most other post-Avengers attempts at a cinematic universe." Mike McCahill of The Guardian rated the film 3 out of 5 stars and wrote "Mukerji brings a peppy, wide-eyed spirit to the superhero-movie model, adorning tried-and-tested arcs and beats with workable Pritam songs, ravishing colours and gorgeous people". IndieWire rated the film C+ in a mixed review criticizing the cast and performances, calling them "bloated" and concluded by stating it as an admirable attempt and unmissable theatrical experience for any Bollywood fan.

Box office 
In the United States and Canada, the film made US$4.5 million from 810 theatres in its opening weekend. With earnings of 189 crore in Hindi and 213 crore overall worldwide in its first weekend, the film emerged as the highest-grossing Hindi film overseas since the COVID-19 pandemic. It also had the highest domestic weekend for an original Hindi film, and the second-highest for a film with screenings in Hindi after K.G.F: Chapter 2. Box Office India in their year-end report gave Brahmāstra: Part One – Shiva a ‘‘hit’’ verdict.

Accolades

Future

Sequels
Brahmāstra: Part One – Shiva is intended to serve as the first installment of a planned trilogy, which is itself planned to be part of an extended cinematic universe titled Astraverse. Media outlets noted the title of the film's sequel that is unveiled after its ending, Brahmāstra: Part Two – Dev, serving as the second installment of the trilogy. It is currently slated to release in 2025. Pre-production work on the second part had started during the COVID-19 pandemic. After that, Brahmāstra: Part Three – Brahmānsh will be serving as the third installment of the trilogy. It is also slated to release in 2026. Both sequels will be shot simultaneously.

Streaming television series
Mukerji revealed Disney had sent him to Los Angeles as an attendee for an international studio summit in May 2022, where he presented Brahmāstra, and discussed plans regarding the film's potential cinematic universe with American producer Kevin Feige. Mukerji further revealed his vision to develop a streaming television series in the Astraverse, as well as theatrical projects, in a similar vein to the Marvel Cinematic Universe. He also called the Astraverse a "large-scale mainstream experiment", saying that he wishes to expand it to gaming, merchandise, virtual reality, and the Metaverse, in the future.

Spin-off
Mukerji revealed a spin-off film based around Shah Rukh Khan's character Mohan Bhargav was in consideration, which would serve as an origin story about how he wielded Vanarastra.

See also 

 List of films with longest production time

Notes

References

External links 
 
 
 Brahmāstra: Part One – Shiva on Bollywood Hungama

2022 action adventure films
2022 fantasy films
Indian action adventure films
Indian fantasy action films
Indian fantasy adventure films
Indian 3D films
IMAX films
4DX films
2020s Hindi-language films
Films directed by Ayan Mukerji
Films scored by Simon Franglen
Star Studios films
Disney India films
20th Century Studios films
Films shot in Bulgaria
Films shot in London
Films shot in New York City
Films shot in Edinburgh
Films shot in Thailand
Films shot in Manali, Himachal Pradesh
Films shot in Mumbai
Films shot in Varanasi
Film productions suspended due to the COVID-19 pandemic
Films postponed due to the COVID-19 pandemic